Aagtdorp is a hamlet in the Dutch province of North Holland.

The hamlet was first mentioned between 1215 and 1226 as Ekthorp, and probably means "settlement in the corner/border". Aagtdorp was home to 111 people in 1840. From the 1950s onwards, camp sites were established in Aagtdorp and it became a recreational area.

References

Populated places in North Holland
Bergen, North Holland